Georgia's 95th House of Representatives  District elects one member of the Georgia House of Representatives. Its current representative is Democrat Beth Moore who was first elected in the 2018 general elections.

House District 95 was last approved on August 23, 2011, when the Georgia State Legislature approved amended House district lines following the 2010 US Census. It was not one of the State House districts that was further amended by House Bill 829 on February 23, 2012.

Recent elected representatives

Recent election results

2012

2014

2016

2018

References

Georgia House of Representatives districts
Gwinnett County, Georgia